Sir William Easthope Davis (born 20 June 1954), styled The Rt Hon. Lord Justice Davis, is a judge of the Court of Appeal of England and Wales.

He was educated at Wyggeston Boys' School, Leicester and Queen Mary University of London.

He was called to the bar at Inner Temple in 1975. He was made a judge of the High Court of Justice (Queen's Bench Division) on 1 May 2014 and promoted to the Court of Appeal on 1 October 2021.

He was awarded an honorary degree - the LLD - from Aston University in 2014, for services to the legal professional and legal education.

He was appointed to the Privy Council on 15 December 2021.

See also
Mark Fellows

References

1954 births
Living people
People educated at Wyggeston Grammar School for Boys
Alumni of Queen Mary University of London
Members of the Inner Temple
Queen's Bench Division judges
Knights Bachelor